Steve Tracy (born Steven Crumrine; October 3, 1952 – November 27, 1986) was an American film and television actor. Tracy is best known for his role on Little House on the Prairie as Percival Dalton.

Biography

Life and education
Tracy was born as Steven Crumrine into an Irish-German family. He attended Kent State University in Kent, Ohio, and was a student  in the Theatre Department at Los Angeles City College in Los Angeles, California, as well as the Harvey Lembeck Comedy Workshop.

Career
Tracy is best known for his recurring role as Percival Dalton in the television series Little House on the Prairie in the early 1980s.

After the end of the series, Tracy maintained a friendship with his on-screen wife Alison Arngrim (Nellie Oleson). Arngrim and Tracy were very close while filming on the set. During the series, there were rumors that he and Arngrim were having a love affair, but Arngrim says that was untrue. Arngrim has also stated that she was the only one on the set who knew that Tracy was gay.

Tracy appeared in several films and other television programs from 1977 to 1986, including Quincy, M.E., The Jeffersons, and National Lampoon's Class Reunion. Six months before his death, he performed in the theater piece AIDS/US: Portraits in Personal Courage in Los Angeles. The piece featured true stories of having AIDS or losing family members to AIDS, with half the cast being heterosexual, at a time when AIDS still was stereotyped as affecting only gay men. Tracy was the only professional actor in the production, as all other participants were non-actors telling their stories on stage because "they wanted to say something."

Death
Tracy died of AIDS-related complications on November 27, 1986, after which Arngrim became involved in AIDS activism. His ashes were scattered under the Hollywood Sign in the Hollywood Hills, Los Angeles, under the letter "D".

Filmography

References

External links

 

1952 births
1986 deaths
Male actors from Ohio
AIDS-related deaths in Florida
American male film actors
American male television actors
American gay actors
LGBT people from Ohio
Actors from Canton, Ohio
20th-century American male actors
20th-century American LGBT people